Geospatial Information Agency (abbreviation: BIG) is the national mapping agency of Indonesia. BIG was formerly named National Coordinator for Survey and Mapping Agency (abbreviation: Bakosurtanal). This national agency is responsible for Indonesian geospatial information per one map policy implementation. In 2010, Susilo Bambang Yudhoyono (former president of Indonesia) stated that Indonesia should have a single referenced map, so there would not be any differences in spatial data for country development.

Geospatial Information Agency is mandated by the Presidential Regulation No. 9 Year 2016 pertaining to the Implementation of One Map Policy to play a key role in achieving the goal of having one standardized map by the end of 2019. Specifically, Geospatial Information Agency is tasked to chair the One Map Policy Implementation Team as stipulated in Chapter 6, Article 3 of the regulation. Furthermore, this agency is also responsible to assist the Acceleration Team chaired by Indonesia's Coordinating Ministry of Economic Affairs to resolve land and map conflicts as the result of One Map Policy implementation.

Despite the agency function as primary imagery intelligence agency of Indonesia and part of Indonesian intelligence system, the agency was coordinated under the Ministry of Research and Technology prior 1 November 2015. On 1 November 2015, the agency coordination transferred to the Ministry of National Development Planning in pursuant of the Presidential Decree No. 127/2015. On 1 November 2022, based on the latest constituting document, Presidential Decree No. 128/2022, the agency placed under the President with Ministry of National Development Planning coordination.

Structure
The latest BIG structure, based on Geospatial Information Agency Regulation No. 4/2020, No. 5/2020, No. 6/2020, and Prime Secretary of BIG Decree No. 98/2021:
 Chairman of BIG
 Center for Research, Public Relations, and Cooperation
 Inspectorate
 Geospatial Services Division
 Geospatial Education and Training Division 
 Prime Secretary of BIG
 Bureau of Planning, Human Resources, and Legal
 Bureau of General Affairs and Finance
 Division of General Affairs and Procurement Service
 Deputy Chairman of Base Geospatial Information
 Center for Geodetic Control Network and Geodynamics
 Center for Topographic Mapping and Toponym
 Center for Marine and Coastal Mapping
 Center for Boundary Mapping
 Deputy Chairman of Thematic Geospatial Information
 Center for Thematic Mapping and Thematic Integration
 Center for Spatial Planning Mapping and Atlas
 Deputy Chairman of Geospatial Information Infrastructure
 Center for Geospatial Information Management and Dissemination
 Center for Geospatial Standards and Institutional Affairs

References

National mapping agencies
Geography of Indonesia
1969 establishments in Indonesia
Government agencies of Indonesia
Government agencies established in 1969